Two Heads on a Pillow is a 1934 American romance film directed by William Nigh and written by Albert DeMond. The film stars Neil Hamilton, Miriam Jordan, Henry Armetta, Hardie Albright, Dorothy Appleby and Mary Forbes. The film was released on October 2, 1934, by Liberty Pictures.

Plot

Cast          
Neil Hamilton as John C. Smith
Miriam Jordan as Evelyn Smith / Evelyn Adams
Henry Armetta as Enrico Populopulini
Hardie Albright as David L. Talbot
Dorothy Appleby as Mitzie LaVerne
Mary Forbes as Mrs. Caroline Devonshire
Edward Martindel as Judge Benjamin Gorman
Claude King as Albert Devonshire
Lona Andre as Pamela Devonshire
Betty Blythe as Mrs. Agnes Walker
Eddie Kane as Samuel Walker 
Claire McDowell as Mrs. Helen Gorman
George J. Lewis as Anthony Populopulini
Emily Fitzroy as Mrs. Van Suydam
Nellie V. Nichols as Mrs. Rose Populopulini
Jilda Ford as Cabaret Singer
Mary Foy as Mrs. Jenner
Jack Kennedy as Mr. Jenner

References

External links
 

1934 films
American romance films
1930s romance films
Films directed by William Nigh
American black-and-white films
1930s English-language films
1930s American films